Papaver californicum is a species of poppy known by the common names fire poppy and western poppy.

It is endemic to California, where it is found in Central Western California and Southwestern California. It grows in chaparral, oak woodlands, and other habitats, often in places that have recently burned.

Description
Papaver californicum is an annual herb that grows a hairy to hairless stem which may exceed half a meter in height.

The flower atop the mostly naked stem usually has four petals one or two centimeters long that are orange in color with green bases. Petals of the similar wind poppy (Stylomecon heterophylla) have purple bases.

The flowers last only a few days at most. The seeds, once scattered, can lie dormant for years; smoke acts as a trigger for them to germinate.

Taxonomy
Papaver californicum is the only species in the section Papaver sect. Californicum.

See also
California chaparral and woodlands
Flora of the California chaparral and woodlands

References

External links
Jepson Manual Treatment: Papaver californicum
USDA Plants Profile: Papaver californicum
Flora of North America
Papaver californicum — U.C. Photo gallery

californicum
Endemic flora of California
Natural history of the California chaparral and woodlands
Natural history of the California Coast Ranges
Natural history of the Channel Islands of California
Natural history of the Peninsular Ranges
Natural history of the San Francisco Bay Area
Natural history of the Santa Monica Mountains
Natural history of the Transverse Ranges
Plants described in 1887
Flora without expected TNC conservation status